Jeison Arley Quiñones Angulo (born September 17, 1986) is a Colombian professional footballer, who plays as a forward for Once Deportivo in El Salvador.

Career
Quiñones played club football with Atlético Huila, Portuguesa FC, Deportes Tolima and Expreso Rojo before joining Unión Magdalena in January 2013.

Pasaquina
Quiñones signed with Pasaquina of the Salvadoran Primera División in the Apertura 2018 tournament. However, Pasaquina did not qualify for the quarter-finals of that tournament. Quiñones scored 8 goals in 21 games with the team of La Unión.

References

External links

1986 births
Living people
Colombian footballers
Colombian expatriate footballers
Association football forwards
Deportes Tolima footballers
Portuguesa F.C. players
Tigres F.C. footballers
Atlético Huila footballers
C.D. ESPOLI footballers
Unión Magdalena footballers
Cúcuta Deportivo footballers
León de Huánuco footballers
Alianza Universidad footballers
Club Petrolero players
Club Real Potosí players
C.D. FAS footballers
Categoría Primera A players
Categoría Primera B players
Bolivian Primera División players
Peruvian Primera División players
Peruvian Segunda División players
Colombian expatriate sportspeople in Venezuela
Colombian expatriate sportspeople in Ecuador
Colombian expatriate sportspeople in Bolivia
Colombian expatriate sportspeople in Peru
Colombian expatriate sportspeople in El Salvador
Expatriate footballers in Venezuela
Expatriate footballers in Ecuador
Expatriate footballers in Bolivia
Expatriate footballers in Peru
Expatriate footballers in El Salvador
People from Tumaco
Sportspeople from Nariño Department